Comics' Greatest World was an imprint of Dark Horse Comics. It was created by Team CGW. Originally conceived in 1990, it took three years for the line to be released, which led to an industry-wide perception that it was created to capitalize on the speculator mania of the early 1990s. When the mania ended, most of the titles were canceled. Ghost, one of the imprint's more unorthodox titles, managed to survive the longest. It was canceled twice, first in early 1998, before being revived later that year and canceled again after a run of just less than two years.

All Comics' Greatest World titles took place in a shared universe. Most of the action centered on four cities in a slightly skewed version of America: Arcadia, Golden City, Steel Harbor, and the Cinnibar Flats area of Nevada, home of an interdimensional rift called the "Vortex".

The series started off with a story in Dark Horse Comics before kicking off in four weekly limited series, introducing the cities and characters. These were followed by several short-lived series, one-shots, and mini-series. Only a few titles lasted very long.

Around April 1995, the imprint was renamed "Dark Horse Heroes". With the name change, the use of the city logos was also dropped.

Environs

Arcadia
First appearance: Dark Horse Comics #8 (intro of X)

"Arcadia is an orderly, smoothly run machine of a city. [...] This is a world of shadow, danger, and bloody retribution." It is a city of corrupt officials and organized crime. The policemen who are not on the take are criminals in their own right.

Major characters:
 X
 Ghost
 Focus (Ghost)
 Silhouette (Ghost)
 Carmine Tango (X)

Other characters:
 Monster (Comics' Greatest World, Will to Power, X)
 Pit Bulls (Comics' Greatest World, X)
 Scream (Hero Illustrated: X Special - Will to Power)
 Lt. Lewis
 Congressman DeMarco
 Commissioner Anderson
 Mayor Teal

Golden City

Major characters:
 Grace
 Titan
 Catalyst: Agents of Change (a group of heroes)
 Law (introduced in Division 13 #1)

Other characters:
 Madison
 Ruby
 Rebel
 Warmaker

Steel Harbor

Major characters:
 Barb Wire
 Motorhead
 The Machine

Other characters:
 Mace Blitzkrieg
 Wolf Hunter
 Ignition
 Charlie

The Vortex and surrounding areas

Major characters:
 Lt. Anderson
 Vortex
 Division 13
 Law
 Hero Zero (Comics' Greatest World, Will to Power, Out of the Vortex)
 King Tiger (Comics' Greatest World, Will to Power, Ghost)

Storylines

The original mini-series
The original Comics' Greatest World mini-series comprised 16 weekly issues divided into four environments, each with four issues. The story followed a group of searchers from the Reaver Swarm coming to Earth to track down the Heretic. Each issue also featured a one-page prologue detailing the Heretic's experiments on Earth during the 1930s and 1940s, which ended in an accident that resulted in the metahuman activity on the planet.

Major characters
 X (weeks 1–4)
 Grace (weeks 5–8)
 Barb Wire (weeks 9–12)
 Motorhead (weeks 9–12)
 Lt. Anderson (weeks 13–16)
 Vortex

Issues
 Prelude: Dark Horse Comics #8-10: "Who is X?" (reprinted in X: One Shot to the Head)
 Comics' Greatest World: Sourcebook
 Arcadia Week 1: X (cover by Frank Miller)
 Arcadia Week 2: Pit Bulls
 Arcadia Week 3: Ghost (cover by Dave Dorman)
 Arcadia Week 4: Monster
 Golden City Week 1: Rebel (cover by Jerry Ordway)
 Golden City Week 2: Mecha
 Golden City Week 3: Titan
 Golden City Week 4: Catalyst: Agents of Change (cover by George Pérez)
 Steel Harbor Week 1: Barb Wire
 Steel Harbor Week 2: The Machine
 Steel Harbor Week 3: Wolf Gang (cover by Chris Warner)
 Steel Harbor Week 4: Motorhead
 Vortex Week 1: Division 13
 Vortex Week 2: Hero Zero
 Vortex Week 3: King Tiger (cover by Geoff Darrow)
 Vortex Week 4: Out of the Vortex (cover by Frank Miller)

Will to Power

Titan, following his exit from Golden City, goes to work for the United States government and comes into contact with all the major characters of the line.

Major characters
 Titan

Issues
 Titan Special #1 (lead-in)
 Will to Power #1-3 (Arcadia)
 Will to Power #4-6 (Steel Harbor)
 Will to Power #7-9 (Golden City)
 Will to Power #10-12 (Vortex)

Hunting the Heroes
Hunting the Heroes was a "theme" series. The individual stories were unrelated and could be read in any order. Released in 1995, this series pitted the Heroes against the Predator, a hunter from another universe. A group of Predators (the aliens from the Predator movies) arrives on Earth and begins hunting various CGW heroes.

Major characters
 X
 Ghost
 Motorhead
 Law

Issues
 X #18
 Ghost #5
 Motorhead #1
 Agents of Law #6

Titles

Special cases
 9 issues of Dark Horse Comics featured CGW stories, including the very first CGW story, the 3-part "Who is X?" (#8-10, later reprinted as X: One Shot to the Head);  #19-20 (X); #21-22 (Mecha); and #23-24 (The Machine).
 At least 4 issues and 1 annual of Dark Horse Presents: #144 (Vortex), #145-147 (Ghost)
 A Ghost story was featured in A Decade of Dark Horse #2.
 Also, the Nexus story in A Decade of Dark Horse #3 featured theme park rides of Ghost and Barb Wire, and Hero Zero made a cameo appearance in a story in The Mask.

Collected editions
During the initial publication period, a black-covered trade paperback was given to retailers as an ordering incentive during the fourth week of each month in the 16-week period. The covers featured the embossed foil logo of the city they represented.

Dark Horse has published a handful of Comics' Greatest World/Dark Horse Heroes titles in omnibus form.

Dark Horse Heroes Omnibus, Vol. 1 – Collects the Comics' Greatest World and Will to Power maxi-series, plus a written summary of the events in between by Chris Warner (January 2008).
X Omnibus, Vol. 1 – Collects X #1-11, X: One Shot to the Head, "Welcome to the Jungle" from Dark Horse Comics #19-20, X: Hero Illustrated Special #1-2 (May 2008).
X Omnibus, Vol. 2 – Collects X #12-25, "Someone to Watch Over Me" from Dark Horse Extra #28-31 (August 2008).
Barb Wire Omnibus, Vol. 1 – Collects all the original Dark Horse Barb Wire tales, including the Ace of Spades series (September 2008).
Ghost Omnibus, Vol. 1 – Collects Ghost #1-12, Ghost Special #1, "Sweet Things" from Decade of Dark Horse #2 (October 2008).

Crossovers
 Godzilla (with Hero Zero)
 Nexus (with Vortex; title canceled before release)
 Predator (with X, Ghost, Motorhead, Agents of Law)
 The Shadow (with Ghost)
 Hellboy (with Ghost)
 Batgirl (with Ghost)
 The Mask (with all characters and locations)

References

External links
 Comics' Greatest World at the International Superheroes directory

 
Dark Horse Comics imprints
Dark Horse Comics titles